The Men's team sprint competition at the FIS Nordic World Ski Championships 2023 was held on 26 February 2023.

Results

Qualification
The qualification was started at 11:45.

Final
The race was started at 14:00.

References

Men's team sprint